Francis Beale may refer to:

Francis Beale (writer) ( 1656), English author
Francis Beale (MP) (born 1577), MP for Northampton

See also
Frank Beal (1862–1934), American actor and director
Frances Beale (born 1940), American feminist